Samuel René Louis Barathay (born 1 June 1968, in Vinzier) is a French rower.

References

External links
 
 
 

1968 births
Living people
French male rowers
Rowers at the 1992 Summer Olympics
Rowers at the 1996 Summer Olympics
Rowers at the 2000 Summer Olympics
Olympic bronze medalists for France
Olympic rowers of France
Olympic medalists in rowing
World Rowing Championships medalists for France
Medalists at the 1996 Summer Olympics
Sportspeople from Haute-Savoie
20th-century French people